The FM H-12-44TS was a light road switcher version of the Fairbanks-Morse H-12-44 yard switcher. The units had an extended frame to accommodate the addition of a short hood behind the cab, and were configured in a B-B wheel arrangement and mounted atop a pair of two-axle AAR Type-A switcher trucks with all axles powered. H-12-44TSs also came equipped with steam generator units as they were acquired solely for shuttling passenger cars in and around the Dearborn Station terminal in Chicago, Illinois.

The locomotives (#541–#543) were delivered in the road's Zebra Stripe paint scheme, though all three would finish out their days on the Santa Fe dressed in the switcher version of the blue and yellow Billboard livery. Coinciding with the end of Santa Fe passenger train service in Chicago, #541 was retired on June 1, 1972 and sold to the Allison Steel Manufacturing Company in October of that year; #542 and #543 were both retired on May 7, 1974, though #543 (the only example to have evaded the scrap yard) was subsequently preserved in Albuquerque, New Mexico and donated to the California State Railroad Museum in March 1986. It has since been moved to the Illinois Railway Museum.

References

External links
 A photo of Santa Fe #542 switching a streamlined baggage car at Chicago, Illinois in August, 1965
 A photo of Santa Fe #542 backing the El Capitan passenger train into Chicago Union Station, March, 1971
 A photo of preserved Santa Fe #543 in Albuquerque, New Mexico on March 29, 1986
 Fairbanks-Morse H12-44, H12-44TS & H12-46 Roster

B-B locomotives
H-12-44TS
Atchison, Topeka and Santa Fe Railway locomotives
Passenger locomotives
Diesel-electric locomotives of the United States
Railway locomotives introduced in 1956
Standard gauge locomotives of the United States